Jurské is a village and municipality in Kežmarok District in the Prešov Region of north Slovakia.

History
In historical records the village was first mentioned in 1294.

Geography
The municipality lies at an altitude of 647 metres and covers an area of 3.826 km².
It has a population of about 1000 inhabitants.

Demographics
According to 2010 census total population had been 1027. In the village is sizeable Roma nationality, which had been claimed by 289 inhabitants, which is ca. 28% of the total population. In 2010 there had been 513 males and 514 females, what is ca. 50% for both.

Economy and infrastructure
In the village is kindergarten. elementary school, football pitch and a foodstuff store. Cultural sightseeings are baroque Roman Catholic and classical evangelical churches.

See also
 List of municipalities and towns in Slovakia

References

Genealogical resources

The records for genealogical research are available at the state archive "Statny Archiv in Levoca, Slovakia"

 Roman Catholic church records (births/marriages/deaths): 1768-1896 (parish B)
 Greek Catholic church records (births/marriages/deaths): 1822-1925 (parish B)
 Lutheran church records (births/marriages/deaths): 1785-1906 (parish B)

External links
https://web.archive.org/web/20160804141719/http://jurske.e-obce.sk/
Surnames of living people in Jurske

Villages and municipalities in Kežmarok District